I Made Mangku Pastika AO (born 22 June 1951) is an Indonesian politician and retired national police  commissioner general (1974–2007), who later served as the 9th Governor of Bali from 2008 to 2018. Pastika was formerly the Chief of Bali Provincial Police and Chairman of Indonesia's National Narcotics Agency. He served as chief investigator in the 2002 and 2005 Bali bombings.

As chief of the Papua Provincial Police Department, his first assignment was to investigate the murder of Theys Eluay, a respected local Papuan spokesman, which resulted in the conviction and sentencing of four Kopassus soldiers.

In October 2003, he was appointed as an Honorary Officer of the Order of Australia, "for service to Australia by heading the investigation into the bombings which occurred in Bali on 12 October 2002".

Pastika was elected to a second five-year term as Governor of Bali in May 2013. His second term ended on 29 August 2018, and he was briefly replaced by an acting official from the Ministry of Home Affairs before being succeeded by I Wayan Koster.

References

External links 
 Beritabali news article

1951 births
Living people
Balinese people
People from Buleleng Regency
Politicians from Bali
Governors of Bali
Indonesian Hindus
Democratic Party (Indonesia) politicians
Honorary Officers of the Order of Australia
Indonesian police officers